Johan van den Sande (or Jan van Sande, in short) (June 28, 1568 in Arnhem – November 17, 1638 in Leeuwarden) was a prominent writer of the common law of Friesland, one of the Dutch provinces, as well as a historian. He was born in Arnhem in the province of Gelderland and studied at the Universities of Wittenberg and Leiden. At the age of thirty he became professor at Franeker (Friesland). He later became a member of the Court of Friesland. His Decisiones Curiae Frisiccae is a treatise on the law in force in Friesland illustrated with decisions of the Frisian court. He quoted from a number of other sources and a wide variety of European writers.

Works (selection) 
 Joannis à Sande: Commentarii duo singulares, quorum primus est De actionvm cessione. Franecherae, 1633
 Joannes à Sande: Decisiones Frisicæ siue Rervm in svprema Frisiorum curia iudicatarum. Leovardiæ, 1639
 Johan van den Sande: Kort begryp der Nederlantsche historien. 3en druk. Leeuwarden, 1651

References

1568 births
1638 deaths
17th-century Dutch writers
Dutch legal scholars
Academic staff of the University of Franeker
People from Arnhem